Gertrude of Northeim (also Gertrude of Nordheim) ( – after 1154/before 1169), was a German noblewoman and regent. 

She was the daughter of Henry, Margrave of Frisia. Gertrude was heiress of Bentheim and Rheineck. She married first Siegfried I of Weimar-Orlamünde and then Otto I, Count of Salm. She was regent of the County of Weimar-Orlamünde during the minority of her son Siegfried II of Weimar-Orlamünde in 1113-1115, and regent of the County of Bentheim on behalf of her daughter Sophia in 1150.

Life 

Gertrude was born around 1090. She was the daughter of Henry, Margrave of Frisia and Gertrude of Brunswick. Gertrude had two full siblings: Otto III of Northeim, who succeeded her father, and Richenza, who married the future Emperor Lothair II. From her mother’s second marriage, to Henry I, Margrave of the Saxon Ostmark, Gertude also had a half-brother, Henry II, Margrave of Meissen.

First Marriage 

Gertrude’s first husband was Siegfried of Ballenstedt. Though marriage to Siegfried, Gertrude was countess palatine of the Rhineland, and countess of Weimar-Orlamünde. 

Gertrude had three children with Siegfried: 

Siegfried II of Weimar-Orlamünde (1107-1124)
Adela of Weimar-Orlamünde, married Conrad I of Peilstein
William of Weimar-Orlamünde (1112-1140)

When she was widowed in 1113, her son Siegfried II of Weimar-Orlamünde succeeded his father as count of Weimar-Orlamünde. Her son was five years old, and Gertrude acted as his regent.

Second Marriage

In about 1115, Gertrude married again. Her second husband was Otto I, Count of Salm, son of the German anti-king Hermann of Salm. Part of the reason Gertrude married Otto was to secure a male protector for her underage sons, Siegfried II and William.  Otto likely became the regent of Weimar-Orlamünde during the minority of her son. 

With Otto, Gertrude had several children, including:
 Otto II ( – 1148/1149), fought against Herman of Stahleck to recapture the County Palatine of the Rhine and was taken prisoner in 1148.  He was later strangled at Schönburg Castle, near Oberwesel in 1148 or 1149
 Sophia, married Dirk VI, Count of Holland (d. 6 August 1157)
 Beatrix, married Wilbrand I, Count of Loccum-Hallermund

After the deaths of her son, Otto II in 1148, and her husband Otto I, in 1150, Gertrude ruled the county of Bentheim herself as regent of her eldest daughter and ensured that her daughter, Sophia, retained possession of Rheineck.

References 
O. Engels, Stauferstudien (Jan Thorbecke Verlag Sigmaringen 1996). 
L. Fenske, Adelsopposition und kirchliche Reformbewegung im östlichen Sachsen
M. Schaab, Geschichte der Kurpfalz (Kohlhammer Verlag 1988). 
R. Hildebrand, Herzog Lothar von Sachsen (Verlag August Lax Hildesheim 1986).
J. Dendorfer, ‘Si(e)gfrid (Graf von Ballenstedt, Pfalzgraf von Lothringen),’ in Neue Deutsche Biographie, vol 24 (Berlin, 2010), pp. 345f.
A. Thiele, Erzählende genealogische Stammtafeln zur europäischen Geschichte" Band I, Teilband 1 Deutsche Kaiser-, Königs-, Herzogs- und Grafenhäuser I
L. Partenheimer, Albrecht der Bär. Gründer der Mark Brandenburg und des Fürstentums Anhalt

Notes

External links
Gertrude of Northeim (in German)

11th-century German nobility
11th-century German women
12th-century German nobility
12th-century German women
Brunonids
12th-century women rulers
German countesses
Countesses Palatine of the Holy Roman Empire
Remarried royal consorts